The Lion Rock Trophy, is a horse race for horses aged three and over, run at a distance of 1,600 metres (one mile) on turf in late May or early June at Sha Tin Racecourse in Hong Kong.

The Lion Rock Trophy was first contested in 2016 and was upgraded to International Group 3 class a year later. It is named after Lion Rock, a mountain in Hong Kong.

Records
Record time:
 1:33.13 – The Golden Age 2018

Most successful horse:
 no horse has won the race more than once

Most wins by a jockey:
 4 – João Moreira 2016, 2018, 2019, 2021

Most wins by a trainer:
 2 – Tony Cruz 2018, 2020
 2 – John Moore 2015, 2016

Winners

See also
 List of Hong Kong horse races

References
Racing Post:

Recurring events established in 2016
2016 establishments in Hong Kong
Horse races in Hong Kong